Valentin Thalhofer (January 20, 1825 – September 17, 1891) was a German Roman Catholic clergyman and theologian.

Biography
Thalhofer was born at Unterroth, near Ulm, on 21 January 1825; and died at the same place, 17 September 1891. He took his gymnasial studies and philosophy at Dillingen, and from 1845 studied theology at the University of Munich. In 1848 he received the degree of Doctor of Theology and was ordained priest. After this he was prefect at the seminary for priests at Dillingen (1850–63), professor of exegesis at the lyceum of Dillingen (1863–76), director of the seminary for priests, the Georgianum at Munich, and professor of liturgy at Eichstätt, and in 1899 became the cathedral provost there.
 
He was an able and highly respected teacher, a man of noble character, a zealous confessor, pulpit orator and catechist, and was a fruitful writer, thorough and intellectual in his work. His employment at the Georgianum, for which he was highly praised, greatly benefited the institution.

Writings
His first publication was a prize essay at Munich on the bloodless sacrifice of the Mosaic worship (1848). In 1855 he wrote in the report of the Dillingen lyceum for that year, a dissertation on the doctrine of sacrifice contained in the Epistle to the Hebrews. In the same year he began a successful opposition to the pseudo-mysticism and Irvingism which were spreading in Swabia at that time. His chief work in this direction was the "Beitrage zur Geschichte des Aftermysticismus und insbesondere des Irvingianismus im Bistum Augsburg" (1857). His excellent commentary on the Psalms was very popular (first published in 1857; 7th edition, 1904). In 1860-63 he edited the official publication of the Augsburg Diocese and brought it to greater prosperity.
 
Among the literary work done during his residence at Munich should be mentioned his editing of a "Library of the Fathers" in eighty volumes (1869–88); a work on the sacrifice of the Old and New Covenants (1870); and the editing of the "Lehrbuch der biblishen Hermeneutik" of his deceased friend Franz Xaver Reithmayr (1874).
 
At Eichstätt he was commissioned by the bishop to revise the "Rituale Romano-Eystettense", and in addition issued a smaller ritual as a manual for the clergy of the diocese (1879–80). He then began his chief work, a large "Handbuch der Liturgik" which rests on a thorough study of the original authorities and is still indispensable. Of the special liturgies, he published himself in 1890 the "Liturgie des heiligen Messopfers", and from the papers of the deceased Andreas Schmid he added to this in 1893 the "Liturgie des kirchlichen Stundengebetes", the "Liturgie der Sakramente und Sakramentalien", and the doctrine of the church year. Adalbert Ebner began a revised edition of this work, but unfortunately no more has been published than the first section of the first volume (1894). Schmid also edited from Thalhofer's literary remains "Die heilige Messe und das Priestertum der katholischen Kirche in 25 Predigten dargestellt" (1893).
 
In addition to these larger works Thalhofer also wrote excellent articles for theological reviews and for the "Kirchenlexikon" of Freiburg.

Sources

1825 births
1891 deaths
19th-century German Catholic theologians
19th-century German male writers
German male non-fiction writers
Members of the Bavarian Chamber of Deputies